Ryann Ashley O'Toole (born February 11, 1987) is an American female professional golfer currently playing on the LPGA Tour.

Amateur career
O'Toole was born in Agoura Hills, California, and graduated from San Clemente High School in 2005. She played college golf at UCLA and recorded 12 top-10 finishes during her college career.  She holds the course record at Royal Colwood Golf Club in Victoria, British Columbia, Canada, with a 66. O'Toole graduated in 2009 with a bachelor's degree in sociology.

Professional career
O'Toole turned professional in 2009, and joined the Futures Tour on February 1, 2009. She competed in eight events on ended the season 80th on the Futures Tour money list. O'Toole participated in the LPGA Final Qualifying Tournament ("Q-School") in December in an attempt to earn membership on the LPGA Tour for 2010, but finished 73rd and failed to qualify.

She returned to the Futures Tour in 2010, competed in 16 events, won twice, and finished 7th on the official season-ending money list.  She also played in her first LPGA tournament in August 2010 when she received a sponsor's exemption to the CN Canadian Women's Open in Winnipeg, but missed the cut.  Her top-10 finish on the Futures tour money list in 2010 earned her conditional status on the LPGA Tour for 2011. She returned to the LPGA Final Qualifying Tournament in December in an attempt to improve her status but was unsuccessful with a 95th-place finish.

She started 2011 playing on the Futures Tour and in the events on the LPGA Tour that her relatively low priority status qualified her for. After a 9th-place finish at the U.S. Women's Open in Colorado Springs, her priority status improved, which gave her entry into more tournaments. After O'Toole finished tied for fifth at the Safeway Classic on August 21, U.S. Solheim team captain Rosie Jones named her one of two captain's picks for the 2011 Solheim Cup team.

She won her first LPGA Tour event on August 15, 2021, at the Trust Golf Women's Scottish Open with a 271 (−17), by three strokes over both Lydia Ko and Atthaya Thitikul. It was her 11th season on tour and her 228th LPGA Tour start.

The Big Break
O'Toole was a cast member on the reality television competition show, The Big Break Sandals Resort, which aired in 2010 on Golf Channel. O'Toole finished in sixth place out of eleven golfers competing.

Personal life
O'Toole resides in Scottsdale, Arizona. She is married to Gina Marra.

Professional wins (4)

LPGA Tour wins (1)

^Co-sanctioned by the Ladies European Tour

Futures Tour wins (3)

1 Shortened by rain from 54 to 18 holes, purse reduced.2 Won playoff with a birdie on second extra hole.

Results in LPGA majors
Results not in chronological order before 2019.

^ The Evian Championship was added as a major in 2013.

CUT = missed the half-way cut
NT = no tournament
"T" = tied

Summary

Most consecutive cuts made – 10 (2017 Evian – 2019 Evian)
Longest streak of top-10s – 1 (twice)

LPGA Tour career summary

 official through 2022 season

Futures Tour summary

World ranking
Position in Women's World Golf Rankings at the end of each calendar year.

Team appearances
Professional
Solheim Cup (representing the United States): 2011

Solheim Cup record

References

External links

Profile at Yahoo! sports
UCLA Bruins.com - women's golf - Ryann O'Toole

American female golfers
UCLA Bruins women's golfers
LPGA Tour golfers
Solheim Cup competitors for the United States
Golfers from California
People from Agoura Hills, California
People from San Clemente, California
Sportspeople from Orange County, California
1987 births
Living people